Arthur John Balliol Salmon (1868 – 1953) was a British artist particularly noted for his illustrations and his work in pencil, chalk and pastels. He was one of the twenty leading illustrators selected by Percy V. Bradshaw for inclusion in his Art of the Illustrator.

Biography

Salmon was born in Manchester, Lancashire, England on 1 June 1868. He was the son of Henry Curwen Salmon and Ellen Fennell, who had married on 6 May 1857. 
  
Balliol Salmon studied for a year under Fred Brown at the Westminster School, where his fellow pupils were F. H. Townsend and Fred Pegram. Salmon continued his training, together with Fred Pegram at Paris ateliers. He trained at the Academie Julian in Paris. He lived in Glasgow and London.

He pursued a career as teacher and illustrator, notably for The Graphic. Houfe wrote in his Dictionary of Nineteenth-Century British Book Illustrators and Caricaturists (1996) that Balliol Salmon was one of the best pencil and chalk artists to work for the press in the Edwardian era.

Balliol Salmon was chosen by art instructor Percy V. Bradshaw as one of the artists to illustrate "The Art of the Illustrator", the seminal collection of twenty portfolios demonstrating six stages of a single painting or drawing by twenty different artists and published in 1918.

Selected illustrations
 Sir Cosmo Duff-Gordon At The British Wreck Commissioner's Inquiry Into The Titanic Disaster - Illustrated London News, 25 May 1912 (Gouache)
 Love Letter, 1908 Ink, watercolour and gouache
 Portrait of Joan Bright.
 Portrait of Ada Reeve on board White Star RMS Majestic 1911

Book illustrations for the series of books by Angela Brazil
Salmon was Angela Brazil's favourite among her illustrators with his lovely elongated schoolgirls. He illustrated seven of her books in the UK. Different illustrators were used for different markets. Freeman states that Salmon's illustrations were jettisoned for comic cartoons in France and winsomeness in America.

In the following list PG indicates whether the book is available on Project Guthenberg. The list is based on searches on Jisc library hub discover, checked against the bibliography in Sims and Clare's Encyclopedia of Girls' School Stories.

Notes

References

External links

 National Portrait Gallery
 Victoria and Albert Museum

1868 births
1953 deaths
20th-century British artists
Académie Julian alumni
Alumni of the Westminster School of Art
British illustrators
Artists from Manchester
People from Northiam
20th-century British male artists